, also known as John Manjirō (or John Mung), was one of the first Japanese people to visit the United States and an important translator during the Opening of Japan.

Voyage to America

During his early life, he lived as a simple fisherman in the village of Naka-no-hama, Tosa Province (now Tosashimizu, Kōchi Prefecture). In 1841, 14-year-old Nakahama Manjirō and four friends (four brothers named Goemon, Denzo, Toraemon, and Jusuke) were fishing when their boat was wrecked on the island of Torishima. The American whaleship John Howland, with Captain William H. Whitfield in command, rescued them.  At the end of the voyage, four of them were left in Honolulu; however Manjirō (nicknamed "John Mung") wanted to stay on the ship. Captain Whitfield took him back to the United States and briefly entrusted him to neighbor Ebenezer Akin, who enrolled Manjirō in the Oxford School in the town of Fairhaven, Massachusetts. The boy studied English and navigation for a year, apprenticed to a cooper, and then, with Whitfield's help, signed on to the whaleship Franklin (Captain Ira Davis). After whaling in the South Seas, the Franklin put into Honolulu in October 1847, where Manjirō again met his four friends. None were able to return to Japan, for this was during Japan's period of isolation when leaving the country was an offense punishable by death.

When Captain Davis became mentally ill and was left in Manila, the crew elected a new captain, and Manjirō was made boatsteerer (harpooner). The Franklin returned to New Bedford, Massachusetts in September 1849 and paid off its crew; Manjirō was self-sufficient, with $350 in his pocket.

Manjirō promptly set out by sea for the California Gold Rush. Arriving in San Francisco in May 1850, he took a steamboat up the Sacramento River, then went into the mountains. In a few months, he found enough gold to exchange for about 600 pieces of silver and decided to find a way back to Japan.

Return to Japan
Manjirō arrived in Honolulu  and found two of his companions were willing to go with him. (Toraemon, who thought it would be too risky, and Jusuke, who died of a heart ailment, did not voyage back to Japan.) He purchased a whaleboat, the Adventure, which was loaded aboard the bark Sarah Boyd (Captain Whitmore) along with gifts from the people of Honolulu. They sailed on December 17, 1850, and reached Okinawa on February 2, 1851. The three were promptly taken into custody, although treated with courtesy. After months of questioning, they were released in Nagasaki and eventually returned home to Tosa where Lord Yamauchi Toyoshige awarded them pensions. Manjirō was appointed a minor official and became a valuable source of information.

In September 1853, Manjirō was summoned to Edo (now known as Tokyo), questioned by the shogunate government, and made a hatamoto (a samurai in direct service to the shōgun). He would now give interviews only in service to the government. In token of his new status, he would wear two swords, and needed a surname; he chose Nakahama, after his home village.

In 1861, Manjirō was ordered to join the shogunate's expedition to the Bonin Islands, on which he acted as an interpreter.

Service as hatamoto
Manjirō detailed his travels in a report to the Tokugawa Shogunate, which is kept today at the Tokyo National Museum. On July 8, 1853, when Commodore Matthew Perry's Black Ships arrived to force the opening of Japan, Manjirō became an interpreter and translator for the Shogunate and was instrumental in negotiating the Convention of Kanagawa.
However, it appears that he did not contact the Americans directly at that time.

In 1860, Nakahama Manjirō participated in the Japanese Embassy to the United States (1860). He was appointed translator on board Kanrin Maru, Japan's first screw-driven steam warship, purchased from the Dutch. Due to Japan's former policy of isolation, the crew had little experience on the open ocean, and during a storm, her Captain Katsu Kaishu, Admiral Kimura and much of the crew fell ill. Manjirō was put in charge and brought the ship to port safely.

In 1870, during the Franco-Prussian War, Manjirō studied military science in Europe. He returned to Japan by way of the United States. He was formally received at Washington D.C., and he took advantage of this opportunity by traveling overland to Fairhaven, Massachusetts to visit his "foster father", Captain Whitfield. Eventually, Manjirō became a professor at the Tokyo Imperial University.

Legacy

Manjirō apparently used his know-how of western shipbuilding to contribute to the effort of the Shogunate to build a modern navy. He translated Bowditch's American Practical Navigator into Japanese, and taught English, naval tactics and whaling techniques. He allegedly contributed to the construction of the Shohei Maru, Japan's first post-seclusion foreign-style warship.

Manjirō was married three times and had seven children. In 1918, his eldest son, Dr. Nakahama Toichirō, donated a valuable sword to Fairhaven in token of his father's rescue and the kindness of the town. It continued to be displayed in the town library even during World War II when anti-Japanese sentiment was very high.  After the sword was stolen in 1977, a replacement was gifted in 1982 and is still on display at the library.

Among his accomplishments, Manjirō was probably the first Japanese person to take a train, ride in a steamship, officer an American vessel, and command a trans-Pacific voyage.

There is a statue of Nakahama Manjirō at Cape Ashizuri, on Shikoku. However, his grave, formerly at the Zōshigaya Cemetery in Tokyo, was destroyed by American air raids in World War II. In Fairhaven, the Manjirō Historic Friendship Society renovated William Whitfield's home to include a museum dealing with the Manjirō legacy.

Minor planet 4841 Manjiro is named after him.

Many books have been published about Manjiro's life and journey such as Heart of a Samurai by Margi Preus, Born in the Year of Courage by Emily Crofford, and Shipwrecked! The True Adventures of a Japanese Boy by Rhoda Blumberg.

A Manjiro Festival, sponsored by the Whitfield-Manjiro Friendship Society, is held in Fairhaven in early October of odd numbered years.

See also

 Hasekura Tsunenaga, one of the first recorded Japanese to reach the Americas, in 1614
Tanaka Shōsuke, one of the first recorded Japanese to reach the Americas, in 1610
Christopher and Cosmas, one of the first recorded Japanese to reach the Americas, as early as 1587
 Otokichi, a famous Japanese castaway to the British and American controlled Oregon Territory in 1834
 Moriyama Einosuke, another translator in the negotiation with Perry
 Ranald MacDonald, the first teacher of English in Japan (Moriyama Einosuke was one of MacDonald's students in Nagasaki in 1848)
 Shimazu Nariakira
 Joseph Heco, the first Japanese person to be naturalized as a United States citizen, in 1858
 Pacific Overtures, Stephen Sondheim and John Weidman's unconventional musical about the arrival of the black ships in Japan. Manjiro is a major character in it, although his story is highly dramatized.

References

Further reading

 
  Donald R. Bernard, "The Life and Times of John Manjiro"
 "Heart of a Samurai" A novel closely based on the true story of Manjiro Nakahama.

1827 births
1898 deaths
19th-century Japanese translators
19th-century sailors
Castaways
Hatamoto
Japanese translators
Japanese sailors
Meiji Restoration
Members of the Japanese Embassy to the United States
People from Kōchi Prefecture
People from Tosa Domain
People of the California Gold Rush
Shipwreck survivors